Adendro (before 1927: Κιρτζιλάρ - Kirtzilar) is a village in the municipality of Chalkidona, Thessaloniki regional unit, Greece.

History
It was the site of a serious railway accident on 13 May 2017 in which three people were killed.

Tansport
The Village is served by Adendro station, with stopping services to Palaiofarsalos, Thessaloniki and Florina, Florina and since 9 September 2007 by Proastiakos Thessaloniki services to Katerini and Larissa, Edessa, and Thessaloniki.

References

Populated places in Thessaloniki (regional unit)